Senator Apperson may refer to:

Harvey B. Apperson (1890–1948), Virginia State Senate
John T. Apperson (1834–1917), Oregon State Senate